The De Gasperi III Cabinet held office in the Italian Republic from 2 February 1947 until 31 May 1947, a total of 119 days, or 3 months and 30 days.

Government parties
The government was composed by the following parties:

Party breakdown
 Christian Democracy (DC): Prime minister, 6 ministers, 12 undersecretaries
 Italian Communist Party (PCI): 3 ministers, 6 undersecretaries
 Labour Democratic Party (PDL): 1 minister
 Independents: 1 minister

Composition

References

Italian governments
1947 establishments in Italy
1947 disestablishments in Italy
Cabinets established in 1947
Cabinets disestablished in 1947
De Gasperi 3 Cabinet